KVLI (1140 kHz) is a commercial AM radio station that is licensed to Lake Isabella, California, United States. The station is owned by Danny and Kait Hill, through Hill Broadcasting, and broadcasts a Classic Country radio format, known as "Outlaw Country"

KVLI is a daytimer station, powered at 1,000 watts.  1140 AM is a United States and Mexican clear-channel frequency so KVLI's AM transmitter must go off the air at night to avoid interference.  Programming is heard around the clock on FM translator K279CZ at 103.7 MHz in Lake Isabella.

History
It featured a variety format that included top 40, middle of the road (MOR), and country music.

In August 2014, Robert J. Bohn and Katherine M. Bohn sold KVLI and sister station KRVQ-FM to Alta Sierra Broadcasting, LLC for $300,000. However, the transaction triggered a complaint to the Federal Communications Commission (FCC) which held up the deal for three years. Calvary Chapel Costa Mesa, licensee of KWVE-FM, alleged that a time brokerage agreement (TBA) between the sellers and Alta Sierra constituted an unauthorized transfer of control because KVLI and KRVQ-FM had no staff on premises. 

The FCC agreed, levying an $8,000 fine against the Bohns in a consent decree. The penalty was later reduced to $6,000, and the sale closed in July 2017.

References

External links
Kern River Radio Facebook

VLI
VLI
Radio stations established in 1977
1977 establishments in California